Augustin de Lestrange (secular name Louis-Henri de Lestrange) (born in 1754, in the Château de Colombier-le-Vieux, Ardèche, France; died at Lyon, 16 July 1827) was a French Trappist abbot, an exile from France after the French Revolution.

Life

He was the fourteenth child of Louis-César de Lestrange, officer in the household of Louis XV, and Jeanne-Perrette de Lalor, daughter of an Irish gentleman who had followed James II of England to France in 1688. The younger de Lestrange was ordained priest in 1778, and was attached to the parish of Saint-Sulpice.

In 1780, Jean Georges Le Franc de Pompignan, Archbishop of Vienne, in Dauphiné, chose de Lestrange for his vicar-general, with the ulterior determination of having him as his coadjutor with the right of future succession. This prospect of being made bishop alarmed de Lestrange, and in the same year he severed all the ties that bound him to the world, and entered La Trappe Abbey, a Cistercian monastery.

De Lestrange was master of the novices in that monastery, when a decree of the National Assembly dated 4 December 1790 suppressed the religious orders in France. Dom Augustin with twenty-four religious left for Switzerland, where the Senate of Fribourg authorized them to take up their residence in La Valsainte, an ancient Carthusian monastery about fifteen miles from the city of Fribourg. From La Valsainte, Dom Augustin established foundations at Santa Susana in Aragon, at Mont Brac in Piedmont, at Westmalle, Belgium, and at Lulworth in England. In 1798 the French troops invaded Switzerland, and the Trappists were obliged to leave the country. Some of them settled at Kenty, near Cracow; others at Zydichin, in the Diocese of Lusko, and in Podolia. In 1802 Switzerland recalled them, and Dom Augustin took possession once more of La Valsainte.

In the following year de Lestrange sent a colony to America under Dom Urbain Guillet. In 1804 Dom Augustin founded the monastery of Cervara in the Republic of Genoa, and Napoleon not only authorized the establishment, but granted it a revenue of 10,000 francs. Moreover, he desired that a similar institution be founded on the Alps, at Mont-Genèvre, to serve as a refuge for the soldiers who were to pass to and fro between Italy and France. To secure the success of this establishment he granted it an allowance of 24,000 francs. This protection was not, however, of long duration. The Republic of Genoa was united to the empire, and there, as in all the other states under the sway of Napoleon, an oath of fidelity to the empire was exacted from ecclesiastics and religious. The religious of Cervara, acting on the advice of some eminent personages, and of some influential members of the clergy who assured them that the pope had allowed the oath, took the oath of fidelity.

Dom Augustin, who had received from Pope Pius VII, then prisoner at Savona, knowledge of the Bull of excommunication issued against the spoliator of the Papal States, commanded the Prior of Cervara to make immediate retractation. The emperor became furious. He caused Dom Augustin to be arrested at Bordeaux and thrown into prison. At the same time, by a sweeping decree of 28 July, he suppressed all the Trappist monasteries throughout the empire. The prefect of Bordeaux, upon the entreaties of several of Dom Augustin's friends, gave him the limits of the city for his prison. The abbot availed himself of the liberty thus accorded him to hasten the departure of his religious for America; he himself obtained from the police permission to go to La Valsainte and Mont-Genèvre, where his presence was required. Pursued again by the emperor, he crossed Germany and arrived at Riga, whence he left for England and America.

On the Caribbean island of Martinique, Dom Augustin was taken into custody by the British governor, General Charles Wale, on foot of a complaint laid against him by an Irish member of the contingent from the monastery of St Susan at Lulworth, one James Power, who seems to have joined with Jeremiah O'Flynn in a quarrel with the abbot. Dom Augustin was soon released and, after the expulsion of his mission from Martinique, arrived in New York in December 1813. The Jesuits had just abandoned a building which they had in that city, and which they had used for a classical school. The edifice occupied the place where now stands St. Patrick's Cathedral on Fifth Avenue. Dom Augustin purchased the site for the sum of $10,000, and in 1814, on the downfall of Napoleon, returned to France and took possession once more of his former monastery of La Trappe.

Dom Augustin was accused of imposing extraordinary hardships on his religious; he was reproached with his frequent voyages and long absences. The Bishop of Séez, in whose diocese is the monastery of La Trappe, took the part of the detractors, and claimed over the monastery the authority of "direct superior". Dom Augustin, to put an end to these disputes with his bishop, abandoned La Trappe, and sought refuge at Bellefontaine, in the Diocese of Angers. The complaints were carried to Rome and submitted to the Sacred Congregation of Bishops and Regulars.

Dom Augustin was summoned to Rome. He returned justified, and loaded with favours by the pope. His remains repose in the monastery of La Trappe in the Diocese of Séez alongside those of the Abbé de Rancé.

See also

References

 The entry cites:
Règlements de La Trappe et Usages de la Val-Sainte (2 vols., Fribourg, 1794);
Odyssée Monastigue, Dom Augustin de Lestrange et les Trappistes pendant la Révolution (La Grande-Trappe, 1898);
VÉRITÉ, Cîteaux, La Trappe et Bellefontaine (Paris, 1883);
GALLARDIN, Les Trappistes et l'Ordre de Cîteaux au XIXe siècle (2 vols., Paris, 1844);
Vie du R. P. Dom Urbain Guillet (Chapelle-Montligeon, 1899)

1754 births
French abbots
1827 deaths
Trappists